Zobrachoidae is a family of crustaceans belonging to the order Amphipoda.

Genera:
 Bumeralius Barnard & Drummond, 1982
 Chono Clark & Barnard, 1987
 Prantinus Barnard & Drummond, 1982
 Tonocote Clark & Barnard, 1986
 Zobracho Barnard, 1961

References

Amphipoda